The Rossettis were a culturally influential Italo-British family.  They included - 

 Gabriele Rossetti (1783--1854), political exile 

His children: 
 Maria Francesca Rossetti (1827--1876), author. 
 Dante Gabriel Rossetti (1828–-1882), poet, illustrator, painter, translator.
 William Michael Rossetti (1829-–1919), writer, critic.
 Christina Rossetti (1830-–1894), poet.